"Truant Officer Donald" is a 10-page Disney comics story written, drawn, and lettered by Carl Barks. Characters in the story include Donald Duck, his nephews Huey, Dewey and Louie, and the boys' schoolmates Butch and Finnegan. The story was first published in Walt Disney's Comics & Stories #100 (January 1949). The story has been reprinted several times since.

Truant Officer Donald tries to catch his school-skipping nephews using radar, a periscope, and other surveillance devices. The story was based on an animated short of the same name released in August 1941. Barks worked on the short with others. In the animated short, the boys elude their uncle and win. In the comic book story, the moral right is asserted: Donald catches the boys and takes them to school to write 'Crime does not pay' on the classroom blackboard.

See also
 List of Disney comics by Carl Barks

References

External links
 Truant Officer Donald

Disney comics stories
Donald Duck comics by Carl Barks
1949 in comics